The Law on Financial Sector Development and Strengthening is an omnibus law formulated by Joko Widodo administration aimed to develop and strengthen Indonesian financial sector. The law passed by the People's Representative Council on 15 December 2022. 

Unlike the previous omnibus laws passed by Joko Widodo administration such as Omnibus Law on Job Creation, Law on State Capital, and 2023 Indonesian Criminal Code, this law is the first omnibus law made under mechanism prescribed in 2022 Law on Law Formulation.

As the law passed, Indonesia currently undergoes national economy transition for next 5 years after the law passed.

Notable Regulations

Digital Rupiah 
Article 10 of the law introduced new form of Rupiah, Digital Rupiah, as central bank digital currency of Indonesia. Digital Rupiah will exist as the third form of Rupiah along with previously known metallic Rupiah (coins) and paper rupiah (paper money). The law mandated Bank Indonesia to regulate the development, issue, and circulation of the Digital Rupiah.

Increasing Sweeping Powers of the Financial Services Authority 
The Financial Services Authority (OJK) will have their power increased by the law. OJK will not only monitor financial services, but it will also possess power to monitor saving and loan cooperatives and cryptocurrencies.

Cryptocurrency 
By this law, the Ministry of Trade's Commodity Futures Trading Regulatory Agency will no longer regulate cryptocurrency in Indonesia. The power to regulate the cryptocurrency will be vested to the OJK.

Insurance Assurance 
Prior the law passed, the Indonesia Deposit Insurance Corporation (LPS) did not regulate and assure the insurance. Article 53 of the law mandated the LPS to expand their assurance coverage from covering only bank savings to include the insurance covering in case the insurance company going bankrupt and have problems. LPS will assure the insurance until the new Indonesia Insurance Assurance Corporation (LPP) formed by the mandate of the law, 5 years after the law promulgated.

Changes to OJK and LPS structure 
As OJK and LPS authorities increased, OJK and LPS both will have Board of Commissioners for their institutional oversight on its own, similar to Bank Indonesia structure.

Status of Bank Indonesia, OJK, and LPS 
By the law, Bank Indonesia, OJK, and LPS established as completely independent body and free from political influence. Article 56 of the law asserted that no politicians ever allowed to hold the Governor and Board of Commissioners of Bank Indonesia, OJK, and LPS.

References 

Law of Indonesia
Economy of Indonesia
Joko Widodo